The world crystal is a theoretical model in cosmology which provides an alternative understanding of gravity proposed by Hagen Kleinert.

Overview
Theoretical models of the universe are valid only at large distances. The properties of spacetime at ultrashort distances of the order of the Planck length are completely unknown since they have not been explored by any experiment. At present, there are various approaches that try to predict what happens at these distances, such as Quantum Gravity.

The World Crystal model is an alternative which exploits the fact that crystals with defects have the same non-Euclidean geometry as spaces with curvature and torsion. Thus the world crystal represents a model for emergent or induced gravity in an Einstein–Cartan theory of gravitation (which embraces Einstein's theory of General Relativity). The model illustrates that the world may have, at Planck distances, quite different properties from those predicted by string theorists. In this model, matter creates defects in spacetime which generate curvature and all the effects of general relativity.

The existence of a shortest length at the Planck level has interesting consequences for quantum physics at ultrahigh energies. For example, the uncertainty relation 
will be modified. The World Crystal implies specific modifications.

References

Literature

Theories of gravity